Hospodar or gospodar is a term of Slavonic origin, meaning "lord" or "master".

Etymology and Slavic usage
In the Slavonic language, hospodar is usually applied to the master/owner of a house or other properties and also the head of a family. The hospodar's house is called  hospóda. There is also an alternative form for the head of the household - gazda, which is also common in Hungary. Hospod is used exclusively when referring to the Lord and has only a slight relation to hospodar.

The pronunciation hospodar of a word written as господар in many Slavonic languages, which retains the Cyrillic script, could be due to the influence of either Ukrainian, where the first letter is pronounced as [ɦ], or that of the Church Slavonic, where it is pronounced as  [ɣ].

The title was used briefly towards the end of the Second Bulgarian Empire. In 1394-95, Ivan Shishman of Bulgaria referred to himself not as a Tsar (as traditionally), but as a gospodin of Tarnovo, and in foreign sources was styled herzog or merely called an "infidel bey". This was possibly to indicate vassalage to Bayezid I or the yielding of the imperial title to Ivan Sratsimir.

The Ruthenian population of the Grand Duchy of Lithuania used the term to style Grand Duke of Lithuania; in that sense it is also used in official documents (e.g. Statutes of Lithuania), given that Chancery Slavonic was an official language in the eastern parts of the Grand Duchy.

Gospodar is a derivative of gospod / gospodin,  (spelled with a capital G, Gospod / Gospodin, it translates as Lord for God).

In Slovene, Macedonian, Serbo-Croatian and Bulgarian, gospodar (господар) means a "master", "lord", or "sovereign lord". Other derivatives of the word include the Bulgarian, Russian, Macedonian, and Serbo-Croatian gospodin (господин, "Mister"), Russian gospod` (господь, "the Lord") and gosudar''' ("sovereign"), the Slovene gospod ("Mister", "gentleman"), the Polish gospodarz ("host", "owner", "presenter") usually used to describe a peasant/farmer (formal name for a peasant/farmer is "rolnik," and common is "chłop" which also means "guy"), and the Czech hospodář (archaic term for "master"). All forms stem from the Proto-Slavic word gospodü (господъ). 

In Slovak and Czech, the word Hospodin (capitalized) is an older and rare address of God. Related to it is hospodár, in a stricter sense an owner or manager of a farm or similar establishment (poľnohospodárstvo or agriculture is composed of "field" and hospodár. In a broader sense, a manager of any resource. The verb hospodáriť is translated as "to manage", esp. money and property. In Czech, the word Hospodin (capitalized) is another address to God. Related to it is hospodář referring to a person, that manages some property (e.g. steward, major-domo, bailiff, manciple or bursar), especially in agriculture (e.g. husbandman, farmer, landowner).

As a term denoting authority the word gospodar has also been the subject of ironic derision.  A good example is the song "Gospodar" from the early 1980s by the Slovene punk rock band Pankrti.

 Non-Slavic usage 
The rulers of Wallachia and Moldavia were styled hospodars in Slavic writings from the 14th century to 1866; the English equivalent of this title is Lord (with the meaning of autonomous ruler).  Hospodar was used in addition to the title voivod (that is, Duke). When writing in Romanian, the term Domn (from the Latin dominus) was used. At the end of this period, as the title had been held by many vassals of the Ottoman Sultan, its retention was considered inconsistent with the independence of the United Principalities' (formalized from Romania only in 1878 — replacing the tributary status). 

The term made its way into the Romanian language after many centuries, but under a different meaning gospodar (female: gospodină) means a good manager of a household or a property (gospodărie).

Hungarian word gazda'' = "potentate", "rich landowner" is borrowed from the language of Southern Slavs who inhabited today's Hungary before the arrival of the Hungarians, aka Magyars, to Europe.

See also
Slavic honorifics
Voivod
List of rulers of Moldavia
List of rulers of Wallachia
Phanariotes

Notes

History of Moldavia
History of Wallachia
Slavic words and phrases
Slavic titles
Heads of state
Serbian noble titles
Bosnian noble titles
Croatian noble titles